L'Espresso is an Italian progressist weekly news magazine. It is one of the two most prominent Italian weeklies; the other is the conservative magazine Panorama. Since 2022 it has been published by BFC Media.

History and profile
One of Italy's foremost newsmagazines, l'Espresso was founded as a weekly magazine in Rome, in October 1955, by the N.E.R. (Nuove Edizioni Romane) publishing house of Carlo Caracciolo and the progressive industrialist Adriano Olivetti, manufacturer of Olivetti typewriters. Its chief editors were Arrigo Benedetti and Eugenio Scalfari.

l'Espresso was characterized from the beginning by aggressive investigative journalism strongly focused on corruption and clientelism within the Christian Democracy. In the 1950s, it uncovered major scandals in the health and housing industries. This made the main shareholder Olivetti unpopular with the ministries and large companies that were the primary customers of his main business. In 1956, with the magazine losing money, Olivetti gave a majority of shares to Caracciolo. De Benedetti and Scalfari entered as major shareholders as well.

The experienced De Benedetti, who had directed the newsmagazine L'Europeo (1945–54),  was editor-in-chief until 1963, when he handed the position over to Scalfari. At the time the average circulation reached 70,000 copies.

The magazine's original format was that of large newspaper; it was converted into a small glossy format in 1974. In 1965, it introduced colour printing for photos, text, and adverts. In 1975, the publishing company N.E.R. changed its corporate title to Editoriale L'Espresso; circulation at the time exceeded 300,000 copies. In January 1976, the Gruppo Editoriale L'Espresso also launched the daily newspaper La Repubblica, with Eugenio Scalfari as editor-in-chief, in a joint venture with Arnoldo Mondadori Editore.

In 1967, l'Espresso revealed the attempted 1964 coup d'état by General Giovanni Di Lorenzo, and in 1976 it conducted a strong campaign against the then Italian President, Giovanni Leone, for his alleged involvement in the Lockheed scandal. During the 1970s and 1980s, it strongly supported the campaigns for divorce and abortion.

From the mid-1970s onwards, a fierce competition developed with Italy's other major newsmagazine, Panorama, founded in 1962. The rivalry increased dramatically in the early 1990s, when Silvio Berlusconi – already controlling Panorama – attempted to absorb l'Espresso as well. The clash between Berlusconi and Carlo De Benedetti over the control of the Mondadori Group resulted in a break-up of assets, leading to the creation of the Espresso Group in its current form, with the CIR Group as majority shareholder.

Renowned journalists and writers who worked for l'Espresso include Giorgio Bocca, Umberto Eco, Giampaolo Pansa, Enzo Biagi, Michele Serra, Marco Travaglio, Roberto Saviano, Naomi Klein, and Jeremy Rifkin. In 2002, Daniela Hamaui was appointed editor-in-chief of the weekly, becoming the first woman to hold the post.

l'Espresso is based in Rome, but its business and finance newsroom is in Milan, Italy, now under Gruppo Editoriale L'Espresso property.

In May 2016 l'Espresso set up a secure platform based on GlobaLeaks technology to collect testimonials about torture and human rights abuse from Egyptian whistleblowers, and to seek justice for Giulio Regeni and for every Regeni in Egypt.

Open letter to L'Espresso on the Pinelli case
The open letter to L'Espresso on the Pinelli case, also mentioned as an appeal (or manifesto) against Commissioner Luigi Calabresi, is a document published on 13 June 1971 by the weekly L'Espresso, with which numerous politicians, journalists and intellectuals asked for the dismissal of some officials, believed to be the authors of serious omissions and negligence in ascertaining responsibility for the death of Giuseppe Pinelli, who fell from a window while he was in custody at the Milan police as part of the investigations into the Piazza Fontana bombing conducted by commissioner Calabresi, who slanderously indicated him as responsible.

On 10 June 1971, the letter was initially signed by ten signatories: Marino Berengo, Anna Maria Brizio, Elvio Fachinelli, Lucio Gambi, Giulio A. Maccacaro, Cesare Musatti, Enzo Paci, Carlo Salinari, Vladimiro Scatturin and Mario Spinella. The open letter was published in the weekly L'Espresso on June 13, on the sidelines of an article by Camilla Cederna entitled Twists and turns of karate. The latest incredible developments of the Pinelli case.
The title was inspired by the hypothesis, which emerged from some early rumors about the wounds found on Pinelli's body and supported by Lotta Continua headed by Adriano Sofri and others extra-parliamentary circles, that Pinelli's defenestration was caused by a karate blow. The following weeks, 20–27 June, the letter was republished, with the support of 757 signatures which included Gae Aulenti, Marco Bellocchio, Bernardo Bertolucci, Tinto Brass, Liliana Cavani, Toni Negri, Eugenio Scalfari, Oliviero Toscani.

Circulation
L'Espressos circulation was 300,057 copies in 1984; rose to 400,334 copies in 2007, making it the fourth best-selling news magazine in Italy; was 334,260 copies in 2010; was 239,000 in 2013, based on the report of the Gruppo Editoriale l'Espresso; and was 195,787 in June 2014.

Editors 
Arrigo Benedetti (1955–1963)
Eugenio Scalfari (1963–1968)
 (1968–1970)
 (1970–1984)
 (1984–1991)
Claudio Rinaldi (1991–1999)
 (1999–2002)
Daniela Hamaui (2002–2010)
 (2010–2014)
Luigi Vicinanza (2014 - 2016)
Tommaso Cerno (2016 - 2017)
Marco Damilano (2017–present)

The signatures
L'Espressos past contributors have included such well-known journalists and columnists as Giampaolo Pansa, Giorgio Bocca, Enzo Biagi, and Edmondo Berson. Its notable current contributors include Eugenio Scalfari, Umberto Eco, Michele Serra, Marco Travaglio, Massimo Cacciari, Alessandro Longo, Gianni Vattimo, Umberto Veronesi, Luigi Zingales, the Vatican correspondent Sandro Magister, the writer Roberto Saviano, and the economist Jeremy Rifkin.

Contributors

Enzo Biagi
Giorgio Bocca
Massimo Cacciari
Umberto Eco
Carlo Fruttero
Massimiliano Fuksas
Daria Galateria
Fabrizio Gatti
Tahar Ben Jelloun
Naomi Klein
Franco Lucentini
Sandro Magister
Alberto Moravia
Moisés Naím
Jeremy Rifkin
Roberto Saviano
Michele Serra
Lorenzo Soria
Andrzej Stasiuk
Marco Travaglio
Gianni Vattimo
Bruno Zevi

See also
List of magazines published in Italy

References

External links

1955 establishments in Italy
GEDI Gruppo Editoriale
Italian-language magazines
News magazines published in Italy
Political magazines published in Italy
Weekly magazines published in Italy
 
Magazines established in 1955
Magazines published in Rome